The Estadio El Arcángel is a multi-use stadium in Córdoba, Spain. It is currently used primarily for football matches and it is the home ground of football club Córdoba CF.

Originally the stadium had 15,425 seats and was roughly oval shaped, with an athletics track between the pitch and the stands.

Since 2004 the stadium has undergone a remodelling to convert it into a pure football stadium. Three of the four sides of the original ground were demolished and the pitch was moved to be closer to the west stand, removing the gap from the previous athletics track. The other three sides were rebuilt, starting with the east stand, which became a two-tiered structure with a large eight-story office building behind it that remains unfinished and empty as of 2017. The north and then south stands were subsequently rebuilt, also with two tiers, though to a much lower height in the second tier than the east stand.

As of 2017, it is unclear if the original west stand will be rebuilt.

On 25 April 2001, it hosted the Spain national football team in a 1–0 victory over Japan.

Gallery

References

External links
Estadios de Espana 

Football venues in Andalusia
Córdoba CF
Buildings and structures in the Province of Córdoba (Spain)
Sports venues completed in 1993